Lieutenant General Habibullah Khan Khattak also known as Muhammad Habibullah Khan (17 October 1913 – 1994) was a Pakistani Army officer born in Wana, Khyber Pakhtunkhwa, Pakistan.

He was the son of Khan Bahadur Kuli Khan Khattak, and was the younger brother of former Governor Khyber Pakhtunkhwa Aslam Khattak, former Federal Minister Yusuf Khattak and Begum Kulsum Saifullah Khan.

His son Ali Kuli Khan Khattak also rose to the rank of lieutenant general and retired as the Chief of General Staff (CGS) in 1998. His son, like him, belonged to the famed Baloch Regiment.

Military career pre-WW2
After completing intermediate education from Islamia College, Peshawar, he was one of the 25 people selected from British India for the first course at the Indian Military Academy, Dehradun. He was commissioned a second lieutenant 1 February 1935 and attached to the 2nd battalion South Staffordshire Regiment 24 February 1935. He was posted to his permanent British Indian Army unit, 5th battalion, 10th Baluch Regiment on 24 February 1936. His seniority as a second lieutenant was antedated to 4 February 1934 and he was promoted to lieutenant 4 May 1936.

Action in World War
He was promoted to captain on 4 February 1942. By April 1944, he was serving with the Bihar Regiment. During World War II, he campaigned in Burma and was amongst a handful of Indian officers to have commanded an infantry battalion at war. He was mentioned in dispatches for service in Burma in the London Gazette 10 January 1946 as temporary Major, Bihar regiment.

Pakistan Army career
His rapid rise in the Pakistan Army saw him as a two-star general at the age of 40, and at this rank he held the appointments of a divisional commander, of the Chief of Training Pakistan Army, of the Chief of General Staff and of the first Military Commander of the Baghdad Pact. In December 1958, he graduated from the Imperial Defence College, London (now the RCDS) and was promoted to lieutenant general rank and appointed as Deputy C-in-C of the Pakistan Army. He was prematurely retired in October 1959 at the age of 46.

For his services, he was awarded the 3rd highest civilian award of Sitara-e-Pakistan, which follows the Nishan-e Pakistan and the Hilal-e-Pakistan.

In 1991, he was invited by the regiment he had commanded, the Bihar Regiment of Indian Army to participate in its Golden Jubilee. He attended the ceremonies.

Politics
After his premature retirement from the Army, Khattak became closely involved in the private industry sector through his company Ghandhara Industries, which he founded on 23 February 1963 and which is headquartered in Karachi, Pakistan. This company produces pickup trucks, buses and heavy trucks.

He also served as a federal minister during Zia-ul Haq's time and made an abortive attempt to contest elections from his home constituency of Karak.

Death
General Habibullah Khan Khattak died in 1994.

References

External links
 BIBOJEE Group of Companies
 2019 Annual Report of Ghandhara Nissan Limited

1913 births
1994 deaths
Pashtun people
Pakistani generals
People from Waziristan
Islamia College University alumni
British Indian Army officers
Baloch Regiment officers
Indian Military Academy alumni
Pakistani industrialists
Habibullah Khan
Recipients of the Sitara-e-Pakistan
Pakistani company founders